Ina De La Haye (1906–1972) was a Russian Empire born actress and singer known for her performances in Britain on stage, film and television. She was also known as Ina Delahaye.

She was married to Colonel J. V. Delahaye from 1930 to his death in 1955.

Filmography

References

Bibliography 
 Wearing, J.P. The London Stage 1930-1939: A Calendar of Productions, Performers, and Personnel.  Rowman & Littlefield, 2014.

External links 
 

1906 births
1972 deaths
Russian emigrants to the United Kingdom
Actresses from Sussex
People from Ticehurst